The Ni1000 is an artificial neural network chip developed by Nestor Corporation and Intel. It is Intel's second-generation neural network chip but first all digital. The chip is aimed at image analysis applications, contains more than 3 million transistors and can analyze patterns at the rate of 40,000 per second. Prototypes running with Nestor's OCR software in 1994 were capable of recognizing around 100 handwritten characters per second.
The development was funded with money from DARPA and Office of Naval Research.

References

Intel/Nestor Ni1000 Recognition Accelerator Technical Specification

Artificial neural networks